Bannar river is a minor river in Gadchiroli district of Maharashtra.  It is a minor tributary of Pranhita River and falls into it near Aheri.

References

Rivers of Maharashtra
Gadchiroli district
Rivers of India